Monroe County Airport may refer to:

 Monroe County Airport (Alabama) in Monroeville, Alabama, United States (FAA/IATA: MVC)
 Monroe County Airport (Indiana) in Bloomington, Indiana, United States (FAA/IATA: BMG)
 Monroe County Airport (Mississippi) in Aberdeen/Amory, Mississippi, United States (FAA: M40)
 Monroe County Airport (Ohio) in Woodsfield, Ohio, United States (FAA: 4G5)
 Monroe County Airport (Tennessee) in Madisonville, Tennessee, United States (FAA: MNV)
 Tompkinsville-Monroe County Airport in Tompkinsville, Kentucky, United States (FAA: TZV)

See also
 Monroe Airport (disambiguation)
 Monroe Regional Airport (disambiguation)